Leonardo da Vinci and A Memory of His Childhood is a 1910 essay by Sigmund Freud about Leonardo da Vinci. It consists of a psychoanalytic study of Leonardo's life based on his paintings.

The vulture fantasy
In the Codex Atlanticus Leonardo recounts being attacked as an infant in his crib by a bird. Freud cites the passage as:

According to Freud, this was a childhood fantasy based on the memory of sucking his mother's nipple. He backed up his claim with the fact that Egyptian hieroglyphs represent the mother as a vulture, because the Egyptians believed that there are no male vultures and that the females of the species are impregnated by the wind. In most representations the vulture-headed maternal deity was formed by the Egyptians in a phallic manner, her body which was distinguished as feminine by its breasts also bore the penis in a state of erection.

However, the translation "Geier" (vulture), which Maria Herzfeld had used for "nibbio" in 1904 in the first edition of her book Leonardo da Vinci, der Denker, Forscher und Poet, was not exactly the kite Leonardo da Vinci had meant: a small hawk-like bird of prey, common in the Vinci area, which is occasionally a scavenger. This disappointed Freud because, as he confessed to Lou Andreas-Salomé in a letter of 9 February 1919, he regarded the Leonardo essay as "the only beautiful thing I have ever written". The psychologist Erich Neumann, writing in Art and the Creative Unconscious, attempted to repair the theory by incorporating the kite.

Interpretation of The Virgin and Child with St. Anne
Another theory proposed by Freud attempts to explain Leonardo's fondness of depicting the Virgin Mary with St. Anne in the picture The Virgin and Child with St. Anne. Leonardo, who was illegitimate, was raised by his blood mother initially before being "adopted" by the wife of his father Ser Piero. The idea of depicting the Mother of God with her own mother was therefore particularly close to Leonardo's heart, because he, in a sense, had 'two mothers' himself. It is worth noting that in both versions of the composition (the Louvre painting and the London cartoon) it is hard to discern whether St. Anne is a full generation older than Mary. Freud also points out that, in the painting, the outline of a vulture can be seen. This is connected to the original fantasy involving the vulture in Leonardo da Vinci's crib.

Sources cited

See also
Psychobiography

Further reading
 
 
 Meyer Schapiro. Leonardo and Freud: An Art-Historical Study. In Journal of the History of Ideas, Vol. 17, No. 2 (Apr., 1956), pp. 147-178.
 Sigmund Freud. "Eine Kindheitserinnerung des Leonardo da Vinci (1910)." Studienausgabe. Vol. 10: Bildende Kunst und Literatur. pp. 87–160, Frankfurt/Main 1969.
 Wayne Andersen. "Leonardo da Vinci and the Slip of Fools." History of European Ideas Vol. 18 No. 1, pp. 61–78, 1994.
 Wayne Andersen. Freud, Leonardo da Vinci, and the Vulture's Tail, A Refreshing Look at Leonardo's Sexuality. Other Press, New York. 2001.

Essays by Sigmund Freud
1910 essays
Works about Leonardo da Vinci